Ignacio Chavira (born 26 June 1936) is a Mexican basketball player. He competed in the men's tournament at the 1960 Summer Olympics.

References

External links

1936 births
Living people
Mexican men's basketball players
1959 FIBA World Championship players
Olympic basketball players of Mexico
Basketball players at the 1960 Summer Olympics
Basketball players from Chihuahua
People from Ojinaga, Chihuahua